Israr Sardar "Daboo" Malik is an Indian music director, composer, singer, actor and scriptwriter in the Indian Music Industry. Malik was born in Bombay, Maharashtra to the veteran music director Sardar Malik.

Discography 
• By Daboo's MWM Entertainment LLP •

Early life
Malik was born 21 January 1963 in Bombay, the second son of music director Sardar Malik and Bilqis Begum, sister of lyricist Hasrat Jaipuri. He has two brothers, Bollywood music director Anu Malik and Abu Malik. Uncle Hasrat Jaipuri (Malik's mother's brother) was a famous lyricist whose work spans from the 1950s to the 1980s.

After Malik completed his Bachelor of Commerce at Narsee Monjee College, in Mumbai, he followed his family's tradition. Malik pursued various artistic roles, such as singing, acting, and assisting Anu in directing music.

Career
Daboo Malik was initially not interested in singing or composing music, preferring acting. In 1988, he pursued a small role of Devavratha in the TV series  Mahabharat  by B.R. Chopra, on DD National   and furthered his career by acting in other movies such as, Beta Ho To Aisa, Tirangaa, and Baazigar. In 2013, however, Malik switched to music—in an interview, he stated: "I was acting and unconsciously working on my inner talent of composing music. I realized I wasted a lot of time. I only wanted to pursue acting for stardom."

His first album as a solo music director, Yeh Zindagi ka Safar, was released in 2001. The following year, he composed his first song "Thoda Sa Pyaar Hua Hai" for Maine Dil Tujhko Diya, followed by more movie music such as Tumko Na Bhool Paayenge and Hum Tumhare Hain Sanam in 2002, I Proud to Be an Indian in 2004 and Kisaan in 2009.

Malik attributes the discovery of his talent as a music director, to Salim Khan. In a 2013 interview, Malik explained: "My meeting with Salim Khan is [sic] unforgettable. He found me similar to my dad's personality, and I sang for the first time in front of him. Salim told me right away that I’m born to become a composer. I get goosebumps even when I think about it now, as my conversation with Salim Khan changed everything, and my musical journey began."

In 2014, Malik further became both the composer and scriptwriter for a forthcoming musical thriller W., directed by Tarun Madan.

Personal life
Daboo Malik is married to Jyothi Malik, They have two sons, Armaan Malik and Amaal Mallik. Both sons actively participate in the Bollywood industry. Armaan is a singer while Amaal is a music composer. .

Filmography
Malik has composed music for Bollywood films such as

Yeh Zindagi Ka Safar (2001)
Tumko Na Bhool Paayenge (2002)
Maine Dil Tujhko Diya (2002)
Hum Tumhare Hain Sanam (2002)
Tumse Milke Wrong Number (2003)
Girlfriend (2004)
I Proud to Be an Indian (2004)
Nehlle Pe Dehlla (2007)
Kissan (2009)
W (2014)
Ekta (2019)

See also
List of Indian music families 
List of Indian film families

References

External links
 Daboo Malik

Indian film score composers
Indian male singers
Living people
Indian male film score composers
1963 births